Reverend Campbell Stephen (1884 – 25 October 1947) was a Scottish socialist politician.

A native of Glasgow, he was educated at Townhead Public School, Allan Glen's School and Glasgow University.

He worked first as United Free Church Minister and then as a barrister. He resigned his charge at the United Free Church in Ardrossan, Ayrshire in 1918 to contest Ayr Burghs in the same year.

He was Independent Labour Party Member of Parliament (MP) for Glasgow Camlachie from November 1922 to 1931 and from 1935 until his death.

He was one of James Maxton's closest political allies within the Independent Labour Party and supported Maxton both in his attempts to foster closer relations with the Communist Party and also during the disaffiliation debate in the early 1930s. Despite his strong support for ILP independence from the Labour Party when Maxton was alive, Stephen resigned the ILP whip to sit as an Independent from July 1947, and rejoined the Labour Party in October, shortly before his death. His death sparked the 1948 Glasgow Camlachie by-election.

In 1945, he married Dorothy Jewson, a former Labour Member of Parliament for Norwich.

References

Photograph c.1925

External links 
 

1884 births
1947 deaths
People from Caithness
People educated at Allan Glen's School
Alumni of the University of Glasgow
Members of the Faculty of Advocates
Independent Labour Party MPs
Independent Labour Party National Administrative Committee members
Independent members of the House of Commons of the United Kingdom
Scottish Labour MPs
Members of the Parliament of the United Kingdom for Glasgow constituencies
Scottish schoolteachers
Scottish socialists
UK MPs 1922–1923
UK MPs 1923–1924
UK MPs 1924–1929
UK MPs 1929–1931
UK MPs 1935–1945
UK MPs 1945–1950
Scottish republicans
Ministers of the United Free Church of Scotland
Spouses of British politicians